The Sims position, or left lateral Sims position, named after the gynaecologist J. Marion Sims, is usually used for rectal examination, treatments, enemas, and examining women for vaginal wall prolapse. 

The Sims Position is described as in the person lying on the left side, left hip and lower extremity straight, and right hip and knee bent. It is also called lateral recumbent position. Sims' position is also described as the person lying on the left side with both legs bent.


Detailed description
The position is described as follows: 
 Patient lies on their left side.
 Patient's left lower extremity is straightened.
 Patient's right lower extremity is flexed at the hip, and the leg is flexed at the knee. The bent knee, resting against bed surface or a pillow, provides stability.
Arms should be comfortably placed beside the patient, not underneath.

Common uses:
 Administering enemas
 Postpartum perineal examination
 Per-rectal examination
 Osteopathic manipulative treatment techniques

See also
 Sigmoidoscopy

References

Diagnostic gastroenterology
Human positions
J. Marion Sims